Dennis Grabosch (born 2 March 1978) is a German actor. He is perhaps best known for his portrayal of 'Roman Wild' in the German daily soap opera Alles was zählt on RTL. As an actor, he has appeared in many television and film productions such as Ein Fall für zwei, Tatort: Einmal täglich, Tatort: Der Traum von der Au, Drei mit Herz, Kommissar Rex, and Doppelter Einsatz. He has also written a few screenplays and directed works for theatre and short films.

Biography
Grabosch has had a long career in movies and television, beginning at the young age of 13, when he won Tele 5's screenplay competition with his short story Der erste Kuß (The First Kiss). Over the next years, he wrote and directed for theatre and short films, including writing the screenplay for actress Katja Studt's short movie Sechshundertzweiunddreißig ('Sixhundred Thirty-four') in 2005.

In 1992, he appeared in Biography: A Game, a comedy play by Max Frisch at the Ludwig-Meyn-Gymnasium in Uetersen.

As one of the original Alles was zählt cast members, he was on the show from its beginning in September 2006 until September 2011. Although he played a professional figure skater, Grabosch did not know how to ice skate before being cast in this role. He was substantially involved in creating, in cooperation with Alles was zählt's writers, the reunion storyline of the popular pairing known as Dero (Deniz Öztürk and Roman). In February 2008, Alles was zählt was awarded Blu Magazine's Best National TV Format award for its portrayal of the relationship between 'Deniz and 'Roman'. Both actors, Igor Dolgatschew ('Deniz') and Grabosch accepted the award on behalf of the series. While their story was spotlighted, the "DeRo" storyline reached a wide international fanbase with over 12,000 subscribers on YouTube. In May 2010, the show had to cut a love scene featuring Grabosch due to censorship by the FSK.
He left the show on 15 September 2011, when his character died of a brain tumor.

In 2007, Grabosch directed a short film Everything About My Mum with David Imper.

In 2009, he illustrated the cover of Kiki Kufenflitzer – Der Eiskristall, a children's book written by Tanja Szewczenko, his former co-star on Alles was zählt. Szewczenko's book is based on a caricature of a young girl he originally drew for her birthday, and was further developed for the book's cover and promotional illustrations.

In February 2015, he was in Porn – The Musical, a narrative drama performed at Schwules Museum in Berlin.

Personal life
Grabosch has two brothers. Like the character he played on Alles was zählt, Grabosch is openly gay. He was once beaten up in a homophobic attack. In 2007, he married Brent Magee, a psychologist. While Grabosch was in Alles was zählt, they lived in Cologne. They both then moved to London. He likes to walk in Brompton Cemetery.

Filmography

Film

TV

References

External links

 17 questions to Dennis Grabosch, 10 March 2010

1978 births
Living people
German gay actors
People from Wedel
German male film actors
German male television actors
German male soap opera actors
German theatre directors
21st-century LGBT people